Petrel can refer to

Petrel, a type of tube-nosed seabird

Aviation and rocketry
Percival Petrel, a 1930s British communications aircraft
Petrel (rocket), a British sounding rocket
AUM-N-2 Petrel, an antisubmarine missile used by the U.S. Navy in the 1950s, later designated AQM-41A as a target drone

Ships
, a name used by four United States Navy ships
, an archaic form of "Petrel" used as a name by seven Royal Navy ships
MV Petrel, a United States Bureau of Fisheries patrol boat in service from 1919 to 1934 that previously served in the United States Navy as 
, a research vessel
Petrel (ship, 1928), a whaler, built in Oslo, left to rust after being beached in Grytviken, South Georgia

Geographic locations
Petrel Base, an Argentine base in Antarctica
Petrel Island (disambiguation)
San Antonio de Petrel, a town in Chile
Petrel, an alternate spelling for the town of Petrer in Alicante, Spain

Other uses
Petrel (reservoir software), petroleum reservoir software